Polar Research is a biannual peer-reviewed scientific journal covering natural and social scientific research on the polar regions. It is published by the Norwegian Polar Institute. It covers a wide range of fields from biology to oceanography, including socio-economic and management topics. According to the Journal Citation Reports, the journal has a 2014 impact factor of 1.141.

References

External links 
 

Biology journals
Ecology journals
Geography journals
Publications established in 1982
Biannual journals
English-language journals
1982 establishments in Norway
Antarctic research
Glaciology journals